Government of Isabel Díaz Ayuso may refer to:

First government of Isabel Díaz Ayuso (2019–2021)
Second government of Isabel Díaz Ayuso (2021–present)